Philip Ivor Johns (born 21 July 1956) is a former English cricketer.  Johns was a right-handed batsman who bowled right-arm fast-medium.  He was born at Fowey, Cornwall.

Johns made his Minor Counties Championship debut for Cornwall in 1977 against Dorset.  From 1977 to 1988, he represented the county in 25 Minor Counties Championship matches, the last of which came against Cheshire, following a 6-year break from the team.  Johns represented Cornwall in a single MCCA Knockout Trophy match against Dorset in 1988.

Johns also represented Cornwall in 2 List A matches.  These came against Lancashire in the 1977 Gillette Cup and Devon in the 1980 Gillette Cup.  In his 2 List A matches, he scored 2 runs at a batting average of 1.00, with a high score of 2.  With the ball he took 3 wickets at a bowling average of 22.33, with best figures of 2/26.

References

External links

Philip Johns at Cricinfo
Philip Johns at CricketArchive

1956 births
Living people
People from Fowey
English cricketers
Cornwall cricketers